Jeff Solem is a retired American soccer player who spent four seasons in the North American Soccer League.  He is currently the president of Uhlsport USA.

Solem attended Emory University, where he holds several school soccer records. He was inducted into the school's athletic Hall of Fame in 1990. In 1973, he Solem signed with the Atlanta Apollos of the North American Soccer League.  In 1974, he moved to the Denver Dynamos for two seasons.  In 1976, he played three games with the Minnesota Kicks.  After retiring, he worked in several sport related industries including sporting goods. He also continued to play top level amateur soccer with Atlanta Datagraphic, joining the team soon after its founding and winning the 1979 National Amateur Cup with the team.  In January 2003, he became president of Select Sports America.  In December 2008, he left Select Sports and became the president of Uhlsport USA.

References

External links
 NASL stats

American soccer players
Atlanta Chiefs players
Atlanta Datagraphic players
Denver Dynamos players
Minnesota Kicks players
North American Soccer League (1968–1984) players
Living people
1948 births
Soccer players from North Dakota
Association football defenders
Association football midfielders
Sportspeople from Fargo, North Dakota
Emory Eagles